Harzanaq (also Romanized as Arzaneh, Arzang, Barzanaq, Erzenek, and Harzanaghé Roodghat) is a village in Rudqat Rural District, Sufian District, Shabestar County, East Azerbaijan Province, Iran. At the 2006 census, its population was 111, in 32 families.

References 

Populated places in Shabestar County